Pachytodes cerambyciformis is a species of beetle belonging to the family Cerambycidae, subfamily Lepturinae (flower longhorns).

Varieties
Varieties include:
Pachytodes cerambyciformis var. anticereducta Plavilstshikov 
 Pachytodes cerambyciformis var. anticeundulata Pic 
 Pachytodes cerambyciformis var. decempunctata (Olivier, 1795) 
 Pachytodes cerambyciformis var. octomaculata (Schaller, 1783)

Description

Pachytodes cerambyciformis can reach a length of  7–12 mm. These beetles have a quite compact body. Elytra are only about twice as long as broad, and clearly narrower towards the end. Head, pronotum and legs are black. Elitra are matt, light brownish-yellow, with black markings, which are very variable and sometimes absent. Usually they show two transversal black bands and a black apex. The first band usually is not continuous, while the second black band is narrower in the center. The suture is normally light brownish-yellow.

This species is very similar to Pachytodes erraticus. The differences are listed in the below table.

Distribution and habitat
This beetle can be found in most of  Europe and in western Asia. It is missing in the North Europe, while in Central Europe it is one of the most common species. In particular it is present in Albania, Austria, Belarus, Belgium, Bosnia and Herzegovina, Bulgaria, Croatia, Czech Republic, Denmark, France, Germany, Hungary, Italy, Latvia, Lithuania, Luxembourg, Moldova, Netherlands, North Macedonia, Poland, Romania, Russia, Serbia, Slovakia, Slovenia, Spain, Switzerland, Turkey, Ukraine, United Kingdom. This species inhabit especially hilly and mountainous areas.

Biology
Adults are often encountered on flowers from May through August. Larvae eat many species of deciduous and coniferous trees, mainly feeding on the roots of Abies alba, Picea abies, Castanea sativa, Salix caprea and Aegopodium podagraria. In April or May larvae leave the host plant and pupate in the ground. The life cycle is complete in two years.

Bibliography
 Bernhard Klausnitzer / Friedrich Sander: Die Bockkäfer Mitteleuropas. Die Neue Brehm-Bücherei 499. A. Ziemsen Verlag, DDR Wittenberg Lutherstadt, 1981
 Adolf Horion: Faunistik der mitteleuropäischen Käfer, Band XII: Cerambycidae – Bockkäfer. Überlingen, 1974

References

External links
 F. Vitali Worldwide Cerambycoidea Photo Gallery 

Beetles of Europe
Beetles described in 1781